The 2014 Ronde van Overijssel was a one-day women's cycle race held in the Netherlands on 2 May 2014. The race had a UCI rating of 1.1.

Results

See also
 2014 in women's road cycling

References

Ronde van Overijssel
Ronde van Overijssel
Ronde van Overijssel